Sekhala (also called Shekhala) is a Panchayat samiti in Shergarh tehsil of Jodhpur district in state of Rajasthan.

National highway number 114 passes through Sekhala Panchayat.

References

Villages in Jodhpur district